Flavobacterium algicola  is a Gram-negative, rod-shaped, aerobic and non-motile bacterium from the genus of Flavobacterium which has been isolated from a marine algae from the Sea of Okhotsk near Japan.

References

External links
Type strain of Flavobacterium algicola at BacDive -  the Bacterial Diversity Metadatabase

 

ahnfeltiae
Bacteria described in 2010